Jhiri is a village in Rajgarh, Madhya Pradesh, India.  The village is noted for the usage of Sanskrit by the local population.

Demographics
Per the 2011 Census of India, Jhiri has a total population of 976; of whom 472 are male and 504 female.

References

Sanskrit areas of India
Villages in Rajgarh district